
Enzo Grossi (São Paulo, Brazil, 20 April 1908 - Corato, 11 August 1960); was an officer in the Regia Marina (Italian Navy) during World War II.

Life and the Barbarigo affair
During World War II he commanded the submarines Medusa and Barbarigo. 
While commanding the latter, Grossi claimed that on May 20, 1942 he attacked and sank a Maryland-class battleship. He also claimed that he had likewise torpedoed and sank a Mississippi-class battleship on October 6, 1942. These attacks, widely publicized in Italy, gained him two Gold Medals of Military Valour and two promotions, respectively to Capitano di Fregata and to Capitano di Vascello, despite the doubts of his immediate superior, BETASOM commander Romolo Polacchini. On 29 December 1942, Grossi replaced Polacchini as commander of the Italian submarines in the Atlantic Ocean. After the Armistice of Cassibile, he joined the Repubblica Sociale Italiana, remaining to command the Atlantic base.

Postwar enquiries
After the war, Grossi fled abroad. A first enquiry in 1949 summarily concluded that Grossi and his crew had imagined everything, and stripped him of the promotions and medals he had received for the actions. Subsequently, in 1962 a new enquiry (motivated by imprecisions of the first one, also accused of being motivated by political reasons) concluded that the crew of the Barbarigo might have been under the belief of a successful attack, but criticized Grossi for his certainty about his sinkings, and did not restore his promotions and awards.

It was established that in the first attack, Grossi had unsuccessfully attacked the cruiser , while on the second instance he had fired torpedoes at the corvette , which likewise missed.

Awards
 Italian
 Silver Medal for Military Valor (24 September 1940)
 Bronze Medal for Military Valor (June 1941)
 Bronze Medal for Military Valor (June 1942)
 War Cross for Military Valor (1942)
 German
 Iron Cross, 2nd Class 
 Iron Cross, 1st Class (11 September 1942)
 Knight's Cross of the Iron Cross (7 October 1942)

References

Citations

Bibliography

 

Regia Marina personnel of World War II
Recipients of the Knight's Cross of the Iron Cross
1908 births
1960 deaths
Submarine commanders
People stripped of awards